Milford Junction railway station was a railway station near to Milford Junction on the York and North Midland Railway south of the south-east connecting chord of 1840 between that railway and the Leeds and Selby Railway. The station closed on 1 October 1904, but the site remained in use for locomotive swapping. The station buildings were demolished in 1960.

See also
 The film Brief Encounter and the one-act play upon which it was based Still Life were both set in a station called Milford Junction. The railway station scenes in the film were actually shot in Carnforth railway station in Lancashire.

References

External links

Former York and North Midland Railway stations
Railway stations in Great Britain closed in 1840
Railway stations in Great Britain closed in 1904
Disused railway stations in North Yorkshire